The Guangzhao Dam is a concrete gravity dam on the Beipan River near Guangzhao in Guanling County, Guizhou Province, China. The main purpose of the project is hydroelectric power generation with additional purposes of water regulation and irrigation. It creates the uppermost or head reservoir on the Beipan and was constructed between 2003 and 2008.

Construction
Construction on the dam began in May 2003 and the river was diverted in October 2004. Reservoir filling began in 2007 and by 2008, the dam and power plant were complete. On June 28, 2010, a landslide in the area of the dam that killed 99 locals was believed to be caused by seismic effects from the reservoir.

Specifications

It also contains three spillway chutes on its surface.

See also

List of power stations in China

References

Hydroelectric power stations in Guizhou
Dams in China
Gravity dams
Dams completed in 2008
Roller-compacted concrete dams